Kyrillos Kallimanis (born 29 April 1968) is a retired Greek football defender.

References

1968 births
Living people
Greek footballers
Kavala F.C. players
Panserraikos F.C. players
Nafpaktiakos Asteras F.C. players
Enosi Alexandroupoli players
Association football defenders
Super League Greece players